This is a list of films which placed number-one at the weekend box office in Chile during 2018. Amounts are in American dollars.

Films

Highest-grossing films

References

2018 in Chile
2018
Chile